TAB (Romanian: Transportor Amfibiu Blindat, translated Amphibious Armoured Personnel Carrier) is the Romanian military designation of armoured personnel carriers. The TAB APCs were based on the Russian BTR series until the early 1990s, with several improvements, including better diesel engines. After 1990, new TAB designs have been developed, such as the RN-94 and the Saur series, but none of these designs entered mass production.

Models

 TAB-63 - prototype, predecessor of TAB-71
 TAB-71 - based on BTR-60. 1872 copies manufactured. In 2010, Romania owned 846 TAB-71 transporters, 375 being in use. Some transferred to Moldova. The TAB-71 vehicles will be decommissioned, scrapped and gradually replaced by the future TBT 8×8 (Saur 3) armored personnel carrier, the development of which was started on March 17, 2011.
 TAB-77 - based on BTR-70
 TABC-79 - 4×4 version of TAB-77
 B-33 Zimbru - based on BTR-80
 RN-94 - a joint Romanian-Turkish design, small numbers of the MEDEVAC version were delivered to Bangladesh (6×6 version)
 Zimbru 2000 - proposed upgrade of B-33 Zimbru (prototype)
 Saur 1 - prototype, 8×8
 Saur 2 - prototype, 8×8
 Saur 3 - proposed design, 8×8
 Saur 4 - proposed design, 4×4

Gallery

Notes and references
Notes

References

External links

Automecanica Moreni website
ROMARM official website
TAB Specifications 

Wheeled armoured personnel carriers
Armoured personnel carriers of Romania
Romania–Soviet Union relations
Eight-wheeled vehicles
Wheeled amphibious armoured fighting vehicles